Globish may refer to:

 Globish (Gogate),  an artificial language created by Madhukar Gogate related to, but independent of, standard English
 Globish (Nerrière), a subset of standard English words compiled by Jean-Paul Nerrière
 Global English, the concept of the English language as a global means of communication